Who Built Scotland: A History of the Nation in Twenty-Five Buildings is a book of essays first published by Historic Environment Scotland in 2017. The 25 essays on the Scottish built environment, past and present, are contributed by five Scottish writers: novelist Alexander McCall Smith, history writer Alistair Moffat, publisher James Crawford, novelist James Robertson and poet Kathleen Jamie. The book was generally well received, with the main criticism being omissions from its "eclectic" selection of buildings.

Publication history
The hardback edition was published on 14 September 2017. A paperback edition was published in 2018; it bears the alternative subtitle 25 Journeys in Search of a Nation on the cover.

Contents
Each of the five authors contributes five chapters. After an anonymous 3-page introduction, the essays are presented in order of the date of the buildings that they cover. Four of the sites are prehistoric and two other buildings also originally date from before 1000 AD. Around half of the sites chosen lie in the Scottish industrial belt and Central Lowlands, with four in Glasgow and three in Edinburgh; there are seven on Scottish islands and only a few in the Highlands, north-eastern Scotland and southern Scotland. One of the book's overarching themes is the effect of tourism.

The book includes full-page plates, mainly in colour, for all 25 buildings. There are also 33 black-and-white photographs within the text, an outline map showing the buildings' locations and a 15-page index.

Critical reception
Allan Massie, reviewing the book for The Scotsman, considers all the contributions to be "admirable appreciations ... written with knowledge and enthusiasm" and states that the book as a whole "paints a fine picture of our strange and varied country and its history." He enjoys the personal element in the essays, singling out Moffat's autobiographical chapter on growing up in a Kelso pre-fab. He also highlights the contributions of Moffat on Glenlivet Distillery, Jamie on Geldie Burn, McCall Smith on Edinburgh's Charlotte Square and Surgeons' Hall, Robertson on Abbotsford House and the Forth Bridge, and Crawford on Mavisbank House. He additionally praises the book's photographs. Harry McGrath, in a review for The Herald, calls it "a very good book; edifying and, at times, revelatory". He praises the high quality of the writing in all the submissions, but prefers the "passion" that Moffat brings to his "rather lovely, meditative essay" on Cairnpapple Hill to McCall Smith's "superior but somewhat remote" article on Iona Abbey. He also highlights Crawford's chapter on Stirling Castle's Great Hall, as well as Robertson's one on Abbotsford.

The five-star review in Scottish Field magazine praises the range and diversity of choices, and the inclusion of lesser-known sites. Describing the book as a "fascinating alternative take on the country's social, political and cultural histories", it finds the human stories most memorable, singling out Jamie's moving essay on Maggie's Centre, named for co-founder Maggie Keswick Jencks, for cancer patients and their carers. An editorial review at the Undiscovered Scotland website describes the book as "inspiring and fascinating" and having "considerable lasting value." It enjoys the variation in form across the chapters, as well as the added breadth achieved by several articles reviewing more than one building. It welcomes the inclusion of unexpected sites such as Innerpeffray Library, Mavisbank House, the Italian Chapel and Sullom Voe, and particularly praises Moffat's "deeply personal" article on the Inchmyre Prefabs, and the light it sheds on "a way of life that was once quite common across Scotland ... but is now largely forgotten."

The book's "eclectic to the point of being quirky" selection of sites was, however, criticised by some reviewers. Massie questions the worth of including Hampden Park and Sullom Voe; he criticises the uneven coverage of Scottish history and geography, pointing out the omission of town buildings in smaller burghs and 18th- and 19th-century rural buildings. Both Massie and McGrath criticise the focus on Edinburgh; the former highlights the exclusion of Aberdeen, while the latter regrets the omission of any of Scotland's new towns. A further critique came from McGrath: noting that only one of the "kenspeckle squad" of contributors is a woman, he considers the book to be dominated by the male perspective, stating that "Only Kathleen Jamie is consistently aware of the fact that women were also involved in building Scotland."

References

Books about Scotland
Architecture books
Architecture in Scotland
Historic Environment Scotland
2017 non-fiction books